Shipkovo is a village in Troyan Municipality, Lovech Province, central northern Bulgaria. The village is known for its mineral thermal spring.

Geography 
The village of Shipkovo is located in the Balkan Mountains, 20 km west of Troyan, and is known as a place for Balneotherapy since ancient times with a hot mineral spring (32 °C / up to 10 liters per second) in the resort of the same name, about 2 km from the village . The mineral composition of the water cures liver, kidney and stomach diseases.

For stays in the resort offer a peaceful atmosphere holiday homes, hotels and villas. There is a swimming pool with mineral water, which heats some of the hotels.

References

Villages in Lovech Province